The United Nations General Assembly First Committee (also known as the Disarmament and International Security Committee or DISEC or C1) is one of six main committees at the General Assembly of the United Nations. It deals with disarmament and international security matters.

The First Committee meets every year in October for a 4–5-week session, after the General Assembly General Debate. All 193 member states of the UN can attend. It is the only main committee of the General Assembly entitled to verbatim records.

Mandate 
The work of the committee falls under seven thematic clusters:
 Nuclear weapons 
 Other weapons of mass destruction 
 Outer space (disarmament aspects)
 Conventional weapons
 Regional disarmament and security
 Other disarmament measures and international security
 Disarmament machinery

Working methods 
The work of the committee usually begins in late September and ends by the end of October or early November. The work of the body is split into three stages: (1) general debate, (2) thematic discussions and (3) action on drafts.

During the first stage, the general debate, the committee discusses its agenda items for around eight days. This period of debate is then followed by two weeks of thematic discussions on each of the seven clusters. During this stage, the body hears testimony from high-level officials in the field of arms control and disarmament. It also holds hearings in the form of interactive panel discussions with various representatives from disarmament entities. In the final stage, the body votes on any resolutions or decisions that it has drawn up during its session.

Reporting bodies 
The First Committee has two main bodies that report to it: the Disarmament Commission (UNDC) and the Conference on Disarmament (CD). It also hears reports from any expert groups it establishes.

Disarmament Commission
The Disarmament Commission meets yearly in New York for three weeks hosting both plenary meetings and working groups. The work of the commission is usually divided between two working groups, with each group tackling one topic from the whole range of disarmament issues for that session, one of which must include nuclear disarmament. The commission reports to the General Assembly via the First Committee at least once a year.

Conference on Disarmament
While the Conference on Disarmament is not formally part of the United Nations machinery, it still reports to the General Assembly annually, or more frequently, as appropriate. Its budget is also included in that of the United Nations. The conference meets in Geneva triannually and focuses on the following issues:
 Cessation of the nuclear arms race and nuclear disarmament 
 Prevention of nuclear war
 Prevention of an arms race in outer space
 Effective international arrangements to assure non-nuclear-weapon States against the use or threat of use of nuclear weapons 
 New types of weapons of mass destruction and new systems of such weapons including radiological weapons 
 Comprehensive programme of disarmament and transparency in armaments.

Bureau 
The following make up the bureau of the First Committee for the 77th Session of the General Assembly:

See also 
 United Nations General Assembly Second Committee
 United Nations General Assembly Third Committee
 United Nations General Assembly Fourth Committee
 United Nations General Assembly Fifth Committee
 United Nations General Assembly Sixth Committee

References

External links 
 Office for Disarmament Affairs - First Committee Webpage
 First Committee for Disarmament and International Security
 Six Committees of the United Nations General Assembly
 Reaching Critical Will

Arms control
1